Maury Ponikwar de Souza (born 2 September 1962), commonly known as Maury de Souza, or simply Maury, is a Brazilian former professional basketball player.

Professional career
During his pro club career, de Souza won 5 Brazilian Championships, in the seasons 1983, 1985, 1986 (I), 1986 (II), and 1987.

National team career
With the senior Brazilian national basketball team, De Souza competed at the 1982 FIBA World Cup, the 1986 FIBA World Cup, the 1988 Summer Olympics, the 1990 FIBA World Cup, the 1992 Summer Olympics, and the 1994 FIBA World Cup.

Personal
De Souza is the younger brother of Marcel de Souza, who is also a Brazilian former professional basketball player.

References

External links
 

1962 births
Living people
Associação Bauru Basketball players
Brazilian men's basketball players
1982 FIBA World Championship players
1990 FIBA World Championship players
Basketball players at the 1988 Summer Olympics
Basketball players at the 1992 Summer Olympics
Clube Atlético Monte Líbano basketball players
Esporte Clube Sírio basketball players
Flamengo basketball players
Olympic basketball players of Brazil
Sportspeople from Campinas
Pallacanestro Varese players
Point guards
1986 FIBA World Championship players
1994 FIBA World Championship players